Frederick Ernest Blackman (8 February 1884 – after 1922) was an English professional footballer, who played for Woolwich Arsenal, Hastings & St Leonards United, Brighton & Hove Albion, Huddersfield Town, Leeds City and Queens Park Rangers.

References
General

Specific

1884 births
Year of death missing
Footballers from Lambeth
English footballers
Association football fullbacks
Arsenal F.C. players
Hastings & St Leonards United F.C. players
Brighton & Hove Albion F.C. players
Huddersfield Town A.F.C. players
Leeds City F.C. players
Queens Park Rangers F.C. players
English Football League players
Southern Football League players